The 2013–14 Bradley Braves men's basketball team represented Bradley University during the 2013–14 NCAA Division I men's basketball season. The Braves, led by third year head coach Geno Ford, played their home games at Carver Arena and Renaissance Coliseumain Peoria, Illinoisnd were members of the Missouri Valley Conference. They finished the season 12–20, 7–11 in MVC play to finish in seventh place. They lost in the first round of the Missouri Valley tournament to Loyola–Chicago.

Roster

Schedule

|-
!colspan=9 style=| Summer exhibition

|-
!colspan=9 style=|  Exhibition

|-
!colspan=9 style=|Non-conference regular season

|-
!colspan=9 style=|Missouri Valley Conference regular season

|-
!colspan=9 style=| 2014 Missouri Valley tournament

References

Bradley Braves men's basketball seasons
Bradley
Bradley Braves men's basketball
Bradley Braves men's basketball